WFBV (90.1 FM) is an American non-commercial educational radio station licensed to serve the community of Selinsgrove, a borough in Snyder County, Pennsylvania. The station's broadcast license is held by Beaver Springs Faith Baptist Church, Inc.

WFBV broadcasts a Southern Gospel music format as a sister station of WFBM (90.5 FM) in Beaver Springs, Pennsylvania and WFBA (90.1 FM) in Kulpmont, Pennsylvania.

History
In October 2007, Beaver Springs Faith Baptist Church applied to the U.S. Federal Communications Commission (FCC) for a construction permit for a new broadcast radio station. The FCC granted this permit on July 6, 2011, with a scheduled expiration date of July 6, 2014. The new station was assigned call sign "WFBV" on July 13, 2011. After construction and testing were completed in January 2012, the station was granted its broadcast license on January 23, 2012.

References

External links
 WFBV official website

Southern Gospel radio stations in the United States
Radio stations established in 2012
Snyder County, Pennsylvania
FBV